Tailapa III (r. 1151–1164 CE) succeeded Jagadhekamalla II to the Western Chalukya throne. His rule saw the beginning of the end of the Chalukya empire. Kakatiya dynasty's Prola II warred with him, defeated and took the Chalukya king captive. This resulted in other feudatories rising against the Chalukyas. The Seuna and the Hoysala started to take away territory. Kalachuri Bijjala II captured the regal capital Kalyani in 1157 when Tailapa III had to flee to Annigeri (Dharwad district). Finally Tailapa III was killed by Hoysala Vira Narasimha in 1162.

References
 Dr. Suryanath U. Kamat (2001). Concise History of Karnataka, MCC, Bangalore (Reprinted 2002).

Sources

 
 
 
 
 
 

1164 deaths
12th-century Indian monarchs
Hindu monarchs
Western Chalukya Empire